

Events

January

 January 6 - The first general election ever in Vietnam is held.
 January 7 – The Allies of World War II recognize the Austrian republic with its 1937 borders, and divide the country into four occupation zones.
 January 10
 The first meeting of the United Nations is held, at Methodist Central Hall Westminster in London.
 Project Diana bounces radar waves off the Moon, measuring the exact distance between the Earth and the Moon, and proves that communication is possible between Earth and outer space, effectively opening the Space Age.
 January 11 - Enver Hoxha declares the People's Republic of Albania, with himself as prime minister.
 January 16 – Charles de Gaulle resigns as head of the French provisional government.
 January 17 - The United Nations Security Council holds its first session, at Church House, Westminster in London.
 January 19
 The Bell XS-1 is test flown for the first time (unpowered), with Bell's chief test pilot Jack Woolams at the controls.
 General Douglas MacArthur establishes the International Military Tribunal for the Far East in Tokyo, to try Japanese war criminals.
 January 20 – Charles de Gaulle resigns as president of France.
 January 22
 Iran crisis of 1946: Qazi Muhammad declares the independent people's Republic of Mahabad, at the Chahar Cheragh Square in the Kurdish city of Mahabad. He is the new president, Haji Baba Sheikh is the prime minister.
 The National Intelligence Authority, and its operational arm, the Central Intelligence Group, are established in the United States; these become part of the Central Intelligence Agency in 1947.

 January 28 – The Canadian schooner Bluenose found on a Haitian reef.
 January 31
 The last session of the Permanent Court of International Justice occurs.
 Yugoslavia's new constitution, modeling the Soviet Union, establishes 6 constituent republics (Bosnia and Herzegovina, Croatia, Macedonia, Montenegro, Serbia and Slovenia).

February

 February 1
 Trygve Lie of Norway is selected as the first United Nations Secretary-General.
 The Kingdom of Hungary becomes a republic, heavily influenced by the Soviet Union.
 February 14 - ENIAC (for "Electronic Numerical Integrator and Computer"), an early general-purpose electronic computer, is unveiled at the University of Pennsylvania; it weighs 60,000 pounds (over 27 tons), and occupies a big room.
 February 15 – The Gouzenko Affair:  Canada announces the shocking discovery of a ring of Canadian communist spies based at the Soviet embassy in Ottawa, passing atomic bomb secrets to Russia.
 February 20 – An explosion kills more than 400 coal miners in Bergkamen, West Germany.
 February 24 – Juan Perón is elected president of Argentina.

March

 March 2
 British troops withdraw from Iran according to treaty; the Soviets do not.
 Ho Chi Minh is elected President of North Vietnam.
 March 4 – C. G. E. Mannerheim resigns as president of Finland.
 March 5 – In his speech at Westminster College, in Fulton, Missouri, Winston Churchill talks about the Iron Curtain.
 March 6 – Vietnam War: Ho Chi Minh signs an agreement with France, which recognizes Vietnam as an autonomous state in the Indochinese Federation and the French Union.
 March 7 – The 18th Academy Awards Ceremony is held. Best Picture goes to The Lost Weekend.
 March 9 – Juho Kusti Paasikivi becomes the 7th President of Finland.
 March 19
 The Soviet Union and Switzerland resume diplomatic relations.
 French Guiana, Guadeloupe, Martinique and Réunion become overseas départements of France.
 March 22 – The United Kingdom grants the British protectorate of the Emirate of Transjordan (later known as Jordan) its independence by the Treaty of London.
 March 29 – The Gold Coast has an African majority in its parliament.

April

 April 1
 The 8.6  Aleutian Islands earthquake shakes the Aleutian Islands, with a maximum Mercalli intensity of VI (Strong). A destructive tsunami reaches the Hawaiian Islands, resulting in many deaths, mostly in Hilo. Between 165 and 173 are killed.
 The Malayan Union is formed.
 Singapore becomes a Crown colony.
 April 3 – Japanese Lt. General Masaharu Homma is executed outside Manila in the Philippines, for leading the Bataan Death March.
 April 5 – A Fleet Air Arm Vickers Wellington crashes into a residential area in Rabat, Malta during a training exercise, killing all 4 crew members and 16 civilians on the ground.
 April 10 – In Japan, women vote for the first time, during elections for the House of Representatives of the 90th Imperial Diet.
 April 14 – Sh'erit ha-Pletah members of Nakam, the "Jewish Avengers", poison with arsenic bread baked in Nuremberg for SS prisoners of war, held at Stalag XIII-D by the Americans.
 April 17 – Syria's independence from France is officially recognized.
 April 18
 The inaugural session of the International Court of Justice (ICJ) takes place at The Hague.
 The League of Nations, in its last meeting, transfers its mission to the United Nations and disbands itself.
 The United States recognizes Josip Broz Tito's government in Yugoslavia.
 April 28 – Kinderdorf Pestalozzi (Pestalozzi Children's Village) is established at Trogen, Switzerland to accommodate and educate orphans of World War II, according to Johann Heinrich Pestalozzi's principles.
 April 29 – Trials against war criminals begin in Tokyo; the accused include Hideki Tōjō, Shigenori Tōgō and Hiroshi Ōshima.

May

 May 1 – At least 800 Indigenous Australian pastoral workers walk off the job in Northwest Western Australia, starting one of the longest industrial strikes in Australia.
 May 7 – Tokyo Telecommunications Engineering (later renamed Sony) is founded, with about 20 employees.
 May 9 – King Victor Emmanuel III of Italy abdicates, and is succeeded by his son Umberto II.
 May 10
 Jawaharlal Nehru is elected leader of the Congress Party in India.
 The first V-2 rocket to be successfully launched in the United States is fired from White Sands Missile Range.
 May 21 – Manhattan Project physicist Dr. Louis Slotin accidentally triggers a fission reaction at the Los Alamos National Laboratory in the United States and, although saving his coworkers, gives himself a lethal dose of hard radiation, making him the second victim of a criticality accident in history (the incident is initially treated as classified information).
 May 25 – The Emirate of Transjordan becomes the Hashemite Kingdom of Transjordan when its parliament makes the ruling amir Abdullah their king on the day it ratifies the Treaty of London.
 May 26 – 1946 Czechoslovak parliamentary election: Communists win with (38%), in the last election before communists take power.
 May 31 – A Greek referendum supports the return of the monarchy.

June

 June 1
 Ion Antonescu, prime minister and "Conducator" (Leader) of Romania during World War II, is executed; he was found guilty of betraying the Romanian people for benefits of Germany and sentenced to death by the Bucharest People's Tribunal.
 D'Argenlieu, French High Commissioner for Indo-China, recognizes an autonomous "Republic of Cochin-China" in violation of the March 6 Ho–Sainteny agreement, opening the way for conflict between the Viet Minh and France.
 June 2 – 1946 Italian institutional referendum: Italians vote to turn Italy from a monarchy into a republic. In the simultaneous 1946 Italian general election, the first since the end of World War II and also the first in which women are allowed to vote, the Christian Democracy party, led by Prime Minister Alcide De Gasperi, wins most seats in the Constituent Assembly of Italy and forms a coalition government. Christian Democracy leads the Italian government continuously until 1981.
 June 3 – Interpol is re-founded; the telegraphic address "Interpol" is adopted.
 June 8 – In Indonesia, Sukarno incites his supporters to fight Dutch colonial occupation.
 June 9 – In Thailand, King Bhumibol Adulyadej (Rama IX) accedes to the throne after the death of his elder brother, King Ananda Mahidol (Rama VIII). He will reign until his death on October 13, 2016.
 June 10 – Italy is declared a republic.
 June 13 – Umberto II of Italy leaves the country and goes into exile in Portugal; Alcide De Gasperi becomes head of state.
 June 14 – The Baruch Plan is proposed to the United Nations.
 June 17 – Formal ratification of the Treaty of London grants independence to the Hashemite Kingdom of Transjordan.
 June 23
 The 7.5  Vancouver Island earthquake affects the island, with a maximum Mercalli intensity of VIII (Severe). Two people are killed.
 1946 French India municipal election: The National Democratic Front wins a landslide victory. 
 June 25 – The International Bank for Reconstruction and Development (IBRD) (World Bank) begins operations.
 June 30 – The War Relocation Authority, which has administered the internment of Japanese Americans, is abolished.

July

 July 1 – Nuclear testing: Operation Crossroads, a series of nuclear weapon tests conducted by the United States at Bikini Atoll in Micronesia, is initiated by the detonation of Able at an altitude of 520 feet (158 m).
 July 4
 After more than 48 years of American dominance, the Philippines attains full independence as the 3rd Republic; Manuel A. Roxas is 5th President of the Philippines.
 The Kielce Pogrom takes place in Poland.
 July 5 – The bikini is first modeled in Paris.
 July 16 – The Bureau of Land Management (BLM) within the Department of the Interior is formed by the merger of the Grazing Service and General Land Office.
 July 21 – An Irgun bomb explodes in Jerusalem, due to secretive talks between Jews and Britain to consolidate the state of Israel.
 July 22 – King David Hotel bombing: The Irgun bombs the King David Hotel (headquarters of the British civil and military administration) in Jerusalem, killing 90.
 July 25
 Nuclear testing: In the first underwater test of the atomic bomb, the surplus  is sunk near Bikini Atoll in the Pacific Ocean, when the United States detonates the Baker device during Operation Crossroads.
 At Club 500 in Atlantic City, New Jersey, Dean Martin and Jerry Lewis stage their first show as a comedy team.
 In the last mass lynching in the United States, a mob of white men shoot and kill two African-American couples, near Moore's Ford Bridge in Georgia.

August

 August 1 - The Scandinavian Airlines System is founded as a consortium of the flag carriers of Sweden, Denmark and Norway.
 August 3 – Santa Claus Land opens to the public at Santa Claus, Indiana. It becomes the first themed park, preceding Disneyland by 9 years, and is later renamed Holiday World.
 August 4 – The 1946 Dominican Republic earthquake (magnitude 8.0) hits the northern Dominican Republic, killing 100 and leaving 20,000 homeless.
 August 7 – The Soviet Union escalates the Turkish Straits crisis through a diplomatic demand to Turkey.
 August 16
 Direct Action Day: Violence between Muslims and Hindus in Calcutta begins "The Week of the Long Knives", which leaves 3,000 dead.
 The All Hyderabad Trade Union Congress is founded in Secunderabad, India.
 The Kurdistan Democratic Party is founded in South Kurdistan.
 August 18 – The Vergarola explosion of ordnance in Croatia kills 70.
 August 30 – Bell's chief test pilot, Jack Woolams, dies in a plane crash while flying the P-39 "Cobra I" over Lake Ontario preparing for an air race the following day.

September

 September 1 – 1946 Turin Grand Prix, the first official Formula One Grand Prix, is held in Italy.
 September 2 – The Interim Government of India takes charge, with Jawaharlal Nehru as vice president, as part of the transition from the British Raj to full independence for India and Pakistan.
 September 4 – Street violence between Muslims and Hindus erupts in Bombay.
 September 8 – Bulgaria is declared a People's Republic after a referendum; King Simeon II leaves.
 September 19 – The idea of the Council of Europe is introduced in a speech by Winston Churchill at the University of Zurich.
 September 24 – Cathay Pacific Airways is founded in Hong Kong, by American Roy Farrell and Australian Sydney de Kantzow.
 September 28 
 1946 Australian federal election: Ben Chifley's Labor Government is re-elected with a reduced majority, defeating the Liberal/Country Coalition led by former Prime Minister Robert Menzies. This is the first occasion where a Labor government successfully wins two elections in a row on a federal level, albeit with a swing against them; among the casualties are former Prime Minister Frank Forde. This is also the first election contested by the newly formed Liberal Party, which had replaced the United Australia Party as the main centre-right political party in Australia.
 George II of Greece returns to Athens.

October

 October 1 – Mensa, an international organization for people with a high intelligence quotient (IQ), is founded by Roland Berrill, an Australian-born lawyer, and Dr Lancelot Ware, an English biochemist and lawyer, in Oxford.
 October 2 – Communists take over in Bulgaria.
 October 6 – Sweden's Prime Minister Per Albin Hansson dies in office of a heart attack.
 October 10 – The Noakhali genocide of Hindus in Bengal begins, at the hands of Muslim mobs.
 October 11 – After a few days of vacancy, the Swedish premiership is taken over by Tage Erlander.
 October 13 – France adopts the constitution of the Fourth Republic.
 October 14 – The International Organization for Standardization (ISO) is founded.
 October 15 – Nuremberg trials: Hermann Göring, founder of the Gestapo and recently convicted Nazi war criminal, poisons himself two hours before his scheduled execution.
 October 16
 The remaining ten Nazi war criminals sentenced to death at the Nuremberg trials are executed by hanging, in a gymnasium in the Palace of Justice, Nuremberg.
 The United Nations' first meeting in Long Island is held.
 October 23 – The United Nations General Assembly convenes for the first time, at an auditorium in Flushing, Queens, New York City.
 October 24 – November 11 – 1946 Bihar riots: Hindu mobs target Muslim families in the Indian state of Bihar, resulting in anywhere between 2,000 and 30,000 deaths.

November

 November 4 – UNESCO is established, as a specialized agency of the United Nations.
 November 10 – At least 1,400 people are killed in an earthquake measuring 7.4 on the Richter magnitude scale, in the Ancash Region and Quiches District in Peru.
 November 12
 A truce is declared between Indonesian nationalist troops and the Dutch army, in Indonesia.
 In Chicago, a branch of the Exchange National Bank (now part of the Bank of America) opens the first 10 drive-up teller windows.
 November 15 – The Netherlands recognizes the Republic of Indonesia.
 November 19
 Afghanistan, Iceland and Sweden join the United Nations.
 1946 Romanian general election: The Romanian Communist Party wins 79.86% of the vote, through widespread intimidation tactics and electoral fraud.
 November 23
 Vietnamese riot in Haiphong and clash with French troops. The French cruiser Suffren opens fire, killing 6,000 Vietnamese.
 The Workers' Party of South Korea is founded.
 November 27 – Indian Prime Minister Jawaharlal Nehru appeals to the United States and the Soviet Union to end nuclear testing and to start nuclear disarmament, stating that such an action would "save humanity from the ultimate disaster."
 November 29 – The All Indonesia Centre of Labour Organizations (SOBSI) is founded in Jakarta.

December

 December 1 – Miguel Alemán Valdés takes office as President of Mexico.
 December 2 – The International Convention for the Regulation of Whaling is signed in Washington, D.C., to "provide for the proper conservation of whale stocks and thus make possible the orderly development of the whaling industry" through establishment of the International Whaling Commission.
 December 7 – A fire at the Winecoff Hotel in Atlanta, United States, kills 119.
 December 11 – UNICEF (the United Nations Children's Emergency Fund) is founded.
 December 12
 The United Nations severs relations with Franco's Spain, and recommends that member countries sever diplomatic relations.
 Léon Blum founds a government of socialist parties in France.
 Iran crisis of 1946: Iranian troops recapture the Azerbaijan province.
 December 14
 The International Labour Organization becomes a specialized agency of the United Nations.
 Proposed United States purchase of Greenland from Denmark: An offer is made through diplomatic channels.
 Aspen Skiing Company opens Aspen Mountain (ski area) in Colorado with Ski Lift No. 1, at  the world's longest chairlift at this time.
 December 15
 The first French India Representative Assembly election is held.
 Iran crisis of 1946: Iranian troops recapture the Kurdish Republic of Mahabad.
 December 16 – Siam joins the United Nations (changes its name to Thailand in 1949).
 December 19 – Viet Minh forces begin a war against French occupying forces in Vietnam, succeeding in 1954 with France's surrender at the Battle of Dien Bien Phu.
 December 21 – 1946 Nankai earthquake; At least 1,362 people are killed in an earthquake and associated tsunami in Japan.
 December 22 – The Havana Conference begins between U.S. organized crime bosses in Havana, Cuba.
 December 24 – France's Fourth Republic is founded.
 December 25 – The first artificial, self-sustaining nuclear chain reaction in Europe is initiated, within the Soviet (Russian) nuclear reactor F-1.
 December 31 – U.S. President Harry S. Truman delivers Proclamation 2714, which officially ends hostilities in World War II.

Date unknown
 The cancelled 1946 FIFA World Cup.
 Female suffrage is enacted in Belgium, Romania, Yugoslavia, Argentina and the Canadian province of Quebec.
 The first female police officers are hired in Korea and Japan.
 The Chinese Civil War intensifies between the Kuomintang and the Chinese Communist Party.
 The British government takes emergency powers to deal with the balance-of-payments crisis.
 Eva Perón tours Spain, Italy and France on behalf of Argentina, a circuit called the Rainbow Tour.
 The 20 mm M61 Vulcan Gatling gun contract is released.
 The Casio company is founded by engineer Tadao Kashio in Japan.

Births

January

 January 1
 Alfonso Caruana, Italian mobster
 Roberto Rivelino, Brazilian football player
 January 3
 John Paul Jones, English rock bassist (Led Zeppelin, Them Crooked Vultures)
 Cissy King, American dancer, singer
 January 4 – Diana Ewing, American actress
 January 5 – Diane Keaton, American actress, film director (Annie Hall)
 January 6 – Syd Barrett, English rock guitarist, singer and songwriter (Pink Floyd) (d. 2006)
 January 8 – Robby Krieger, American rock musician (The Doors)
 January 9 
 Levon Ter-Petrosyan, President of Armenia
 Mogens Lykketoft, Danish politician
 January 10
 Kalidas Karmakar, Bangladeshi artist
 Ha Yu, Hong Kong actor
 January 12 – George Duke, African-American musician (d. 2013)
 January 14
 Feró Nagy, Hungarian singer
 Harold Shipman, British serial killer (d. 2004)
 January 16
 Kabir Bedi, Indian actor
 Michael Coats, American astronaut
 Katia Ricciarelli, Italian singer
 January 18
 Paul Shmyr, Canadian former National Hockey League player (d. 2004) 
 Joseph Deiss, Swiss Federal Councillor
 January 19
 Julian Barnes, English novelist
 Dolly Parton, American singer-songwriter, actress, businesswoman and philanthropist
 January 20 – David Lynch, American film director
 January 22
 Malcolm McLaren, English singer, songwriter, musician and music manager (d. 2010)
 Serge Savard, Canadian hockey player, executive
 January 23 – Arnoldo Alemán, President of Nicaragua
 January 24 – Michael Ontkean, Canadian actor (The Rookies)
 January 25 – Géza Bereményi, Hungarian writer, screenwriter and film director
 January 26
 Gene Siskel, American film critic (Sneak Previews) (d. 1999)
 Michel Delpech, French singer, songwriter and actor (d. 2016)
 January 27 – Nedra Talley, African-American singer (The Ronettes)
 January 29 – Bettye LaVette, African-American soul singer, songwriter
 January 31 – Terry Kath, American rock musician (Chicago) (d. 1978)

February

 February 1 – Elisabeth Sladen, English actress (d. 2011)
 February 2
 Isaias Afwerki, President of Eritrea
 Blake Clark, American actor, comedian
 February 5 – Charlotte Rampling, British actress
 February 6 
 Kate McGarrigle, Canadian singer, songwriter (d. 2010) 
 Jim Turner, American politician
 February 7
 Sammy Johns, American country music singer, songwriter (d. 2013)
 Pete Postlethwaite, English actor (d. 2011)
 February 9 – Seán Neeson, Northern Irish politician
 February 13 
 Joe Estevez, American actor
 Colin Matthews, British composer
 February 14
 Bernard Dowiyogo, 7-time President of Nauru (d. 2003)
 Gregory Hines, African-American dancer, actor (d. 2003)
 February 16 – Marvin Sease, American blues, and soul singer-songwriter (d. 2011)
 February 19 – Karen Silkwood, American activist (d. 1974)
 February 20
 Brenda Blethyn, British actress
 Sandy Duncan, American singer, dancer, comedian and actress
 J. Geils, American guitarist (The J. Geils Band) (d. 2017)
 February 21
 Alan Rickman, English actor, film director (d. 2016)
 Anthony Daniels, English actor
 Vito Rizzuto, Italian-Canadian mobster (d. 2013)
 Monica Johnson, American screenwriter (d. 2010)
 Tyne Daly, American actress (Cagney & Lacey)
 February 26 – Jiří Bělohlávek, Czech orchestral conductor (d. 2017)
 February 25
 Andrew Ang, judge of the Supreme Court of Singapore
 Franz Xaver Kroetz, German dramatist
 Jean Todt, French motorsport manager
 February 26 – Ahmed Zewail, Egyptian-born chemist, Nobel Prize laureate (d. 2016)
 February 27 – Alexandra Hamilton, Duchess of Abercorn, British aristocrat (d. 2018)
 February 28
 Don Ciccone, American singer, songwriter (The Critters) (d. 2016)
 Robin Cook, British politician (d. 2005)
 Don Francisco, American Christian musician
 Syreeta Wright, African-American singer, songwriter ("With You I'm Born Again") (d. 2004)

March

 March 1
 Jan Kodeš, Czech tennis player
 Lana Wood, American actress, producer
 March 4
 Michael Ashcroft, English entrepreneur
 Haile Gerima, Ethiopian filmmaker
 Harvey Goldsmith, British impresario
 March 5
 Murray Head, English singer, actor
 Lova Moor, French singer, dancer
 March 6
 Larry Huber, American television producer, animator
 David Gilmour, English rock musician (Pink Floyd)
 March 7
 John Heard, American actor (d. 2017)
 Okko Kamu, Finnish conductor, violinist
 Leandro Mendoza, Filipino politician (d. 2013)
 Peter Wolf, American rock musician (The J. Geils Band)
 March 10 – Mike Hollands, Australian animator
 March 12
 Frank Welker, American voice actor, singer
 Liza Minnelli, American singer, actress
 March 13 – Yonatan Netanyahu, American-born Israeli Army officer (d. in Operation Entebbe) (d. 1976)
 March 14
 Álvaro Arzú, 32nd President of Guatemala (d. 2018)
 Wes Unseld, American basketball player (d. 2020)
 March 15 – Bobby Bonds, American baseball player, manager (d. 2003)
 March 17 – Georges J. F. Köhler, German biologist, recipient of the Nobel Prize in Physiology or Medicine (d. 1995)
 March 18 – Larry Langford, American politician (d. 2019)
 March 19 – Steve Halliwell, English actor
 March 21 – Timothy Dalton, Welsh actor
 March 25 – Cliff Balsom, English footballer
 March 26 – Gil Carlos Rodríguez Iglesias, Spanish judge (d. 2019) 
 March 27
 Mike Jackson, American baseball pitcher
 Miklós Lukáts, Hungarian politician (d. 2022)
 March 28 – Alejandro Toledo, 63rd President of Peru
 March 29 
 Segun Bucknor, Nigerian musician, journalist (d. 2017)
 Billy Thorpe, English-born Australian singer, songwriter (d. 2007)
 March 30 – Carolyn Simpson, judge of the Supreme Court of New South Wales
 March 31 
 Gonzalo Márquez, Venezuelan Major League Baseball player (d. 1984)
 F'Murr, French comics artist (d. 2018)

April

 April 1 – Ronnie Lane, English musician (Small Faces, Faces) (d. 1997)
 April 2 – Hamengkubuwono X, Sultan of the historic Yogyakarta Sultanate in Indonesia, the current Governor of Yogyakarta Special Region 
 April 3 – Hanna Suchocka, Prime Minister of Poland
 April 4 – Dave Hill, English guitarist (Slade)
 April 5
 Jane Asher, English actress
 János Bródy, Hungarian singer, guitarist, composer and songwriter
 Björn Granath, Swedish actor (d. 2017)
 April 7
 Colette Besson, French track and field athlete (d. 2005)
 Léon Krier, Luxembourgian architect
 April 8
 Catfish Hunter, American baseball player (d. 1999)
 Tim Thomerson, American actor and comedian
 April 10 – David Angell, American television producer (d. 2001)
 April 11 – Chris Burden, American artist (d. 2015)
 April 12 – Ed O'Neill, American actor (Married... with Children)
 April 13 – Al Green, African-American singer, songwriter and record producer
 April 15 – Marsha Hunt, American actress, singer and novelist
 April 16 – Margot Adler, American journalist
 April 18 – Hayley Mills, English actress
 April 19 – Tim Curry, British actor, voice artist and singer (The Rocky Horror Picture Show)
 April 20 
 Julien Poulin, Canadian actor
 Ricardo Maduro, President of Honduras
 April 22 
 John Waters, American film director 
 Paul Davies, English physicist
 April 24 – Phil Robertson, American businessman and reality television personality
 April 25
 John Fox, British statistician
 Talia Shire, American actress (Rocky)
 Strobe Talbott, American journalist
 Vladimir Zhirinovsky, Russian politician (d. 2022)
 April 26
 Jennie Stoller, British actress (d. 2018) 
 Richard S. Fuld Jr., American banker
 April 28 – Nour El-Sherif, Egyptian actor (d. 2015)
 April 29 – Franc Roddam, English film director, businessman, screenwriter, television producer and publisher
 April 30 
 King Carl XVI Gustaf of Sweden
 Bill Plympton, American animator, graphic designer, cartoonist, and filmmaker

May

 May 1 – Joanna Lumley, English actress, author
 May 2
 Lesley Gore, American rock singer ("It's My Party") (d. 2015)
 Ralf Gothóni, Finnish pianist, conductor and composer
 May 3 – Mohammed Ibrahim, businessman and philanthropist
 May 4 – John Watson, Northern Irish racecar driver
 May 5
 Jim Kelly, African-American actor, martial artist and tennis player (d. 2013)
 Kebby Musokotwane, Prime Minister of Zambia (d. 1996)
 Beth Carvalho, Brazilian samba singer, guitarist and composer (d. 2019)
 May 6 – Daouda Malam Wanké, 6th President of Niger (d. 2004)
 May 7
 Thelma Houston, African-American singer ("Don't Leave Me This Way")
 Bill Kreutzmann, American drummer (Grateful Dead)
 Michael Rosen, British novelist, poet
 May 9 – Candice Bergen, American actress
 May 10
 Donovan, Scottish rock musician ("Sunshine Superman")
 Birutė Galdikas, Canadian anthropologist, primatologist, conservationist, ethologist and author
 Graham Gouldman, English songwriter, musician (10cc, Wax)
 Dave Mason, English rock musician (Traffic)
 Murade Isaac Murargy, Mozambican diplomat, politician
 May 11 – Robert Jarvik, American physicist, artificial heart inventor
 May 12 – Richard Bruce Silverman, John Evans Professor of Chemistry at Northwestern University
 May 13 – Tim Pigott-Smith, English actor, author (d. 2017)
 May 16 – Robert Fripp, British musician
 May 17 – Udo Lindenberg, German musician             
 May 18 
 Reggie Jackson, American baseball player
 Andreas Katsulas, American actor (d. 2006)
 Ken Kwaku, Ghanaian corporate governance expert
 May 19
 André the Giant, French professional wrestler and actor (d. 1993)
 Claude Lelièvre, Belgian Commissioner for Children Rights
 Roger Sloman, English actor
 May 20
 Craig Patrick, American-Canadian hockey player, coach and manager
 Cher, American actress, rock singer
 May 22 
 George Best, Northern Irish footballer (d. 2005)
 Howard Kendall, English footballer (d. 2015)
 May 23 – Frederik de Groot, Dutch actor
 May 24
 Tansu Çiller, Turkish politician, Prime Minister of Turkey
 Irena Szewińska, Polish Olympic sprinter (d. 2018)
 Nicolau dos Reis Lobato, East Timorese politician, acting President of East Timor (d. 1978)
 May 26 – Mick Ronson, English guitarist (d. 1993)
 May 28
 Bruce Alexander, English actor
 K. Satchidanandan, Malayalam poet
 May 29 – Fernando Buesa, Basque politician (d. 2000)
 May 30 
 Dragan Džajić, Serbian footballer
 Candy Lightner, American founder of Mothers Against Drunk Driving
 May 31 – Adriana Bittel, Romanian writer

June

 June 1 – Brian Cox, Scottish actor
 June 2 
 Peter Sutcliffe, English serial killer (d. 2020)
 Tomomichi Nishimura, Japanese voice actor
 June 3 – Michael Clarke, American musician (d. 1993)
 June 5 – Stefania Sandrelli, Italian actress
 June 7
 Jenny Jones, Palestinian-Canadian comedian, talk show hostess
 Zbigniew Seifert, Polish musician (d. 1979)
 Robert Tilton, American televangelist, author
 June 8 – Pearlette Louisy, Governor-General of St. Lucia
 June 10 – Fernando Balzaretti, Mexican actor (d. 1998)
 June 11 – Biancamaria Frabotta, Italian writer (d. 2022)
 June 13 – Paul L. Modrich, American biochemist, recipient of the Nobel Prize in Chemistry
 June 14 – Donald Trump, American businessman, television personality, 45th President of the United States
 June 15
 Noddy Holder, English rock singer (Slade)
 Janet Lennon, American singer (The Lennon Sisters)
 Demis Roussos, Greek singer (d. 2015)
 June 17 – Marcy Kaptur, U.S. Representative for the Ninth Congressional District of Ohio
 June 18
 Bruiser Brody, American professional wrestler (d. 1988)
 Russell Ash, British author (d. 2010)
 Fabio Capello, Italian football player, manager
 June 21
 Vincenzo Camporini, Italian Chief of the Defence General Staff
 Kiril Ivkov, Bulgarian football defender
 June 22 
 Kay Redfield Jamison, American psychiatrist
 Fabio Enzo, Italian football player (d. 2021)
 Józef Oleksy, 7th Prime Minister of Poland (d. 2015)
 June 23 – Ted Shackelford, American actor
 June 24
 Nguyễn Đức Soát, Vietnamese general
 Ellison Onizuka, American astronaut (d. 1986)
 Robert Reich, 22nd United States Secretary of Labor
 June 25 
 Pete Vanderwaal, Dutch engineer
 Henk van Kessel, Dutch road racer
 June 26 
 Maria von Welser, German TV journalist, President of UNICEF Germany
 Anthony John Valentine Obinna, Nigerian priest
 Leo Rossi, American actor
 Ricky Jay, American actor, author, and magician (d. 2018)
 June 27 – Russ Critchfield, American basketball player
 June 28 
 David Duckham, English rugby union player
 Gilda Radner, American comedian, actress (Saturday Night Live) (d. 1989)
 Jaime Guzmán, Chilean lawyer and senator, founder of the Independent Democratic Union (d. 1991)
 June 29 
 Egon von Fürstenberg, Swiss fashion designer (d. 2004)
 Gitte Hænning, Danish singer 
 Ram Gopal Yadav, Indian politician
 Ernesto Pérez Balladares, President of Panama
 June 30 – Allan Hunter, Irish footballer, manager

July

 July 1 
 Alceu Valença, Brazilian composer, writer, performer, actor, and poet
 Mireya Moscoso, President of Panama
 July 2 – Richard Axel, American scientist, recipient of the Nobel Prize in Physiology or Medicine
 July 3 – Leszek Miller, Prime Minister of Poland
 July 4
 Sam Hunt, New Zealand poet
 Michael Milken, American financier
 Ed O'Ross, American actor
 Roy Cimatu, Filipino general
 July 5 
 Gerard 't Hooft, Dutch physicist and academic, Nobel Prize laureate
 Ram Vilas Paswan, Indian politician
 July 6
 George W. Bush, 43rd President of the United States
 Fred Dryer, American football defensive end, actor (Hunter)
 Tiemen Groen, Dutch cyclist
 Peter Singer, Australian philosopher
 Sylvester Stallone, American actor, screenwriter and film director (Rocky)
 July 7 – Tadeusz Nowicki, Polish tennis player
 July 8 
 Massimo Vanni, Italian actor
 Daniela Beneck, Italian freestyle swimmer
 July 9
Mitch Mitchell, English drummer (The Jimi Hendrix Experience) (d. 2008)
 Bon Scott, Australian rock singer (AC/DC) (d. 1980)
 July 10
 Oliver Martin, American cyclist
 Sue Lyon, American actress (d. 2019)
 July 11 
 Jean-Pierre Coopman, Belgian boxer
 Jack Wrangler, American porn star (d. 2009)
 July 12 – Ernesto Mahieux, Italian actor
 July 13
 João Bosco, Brazilian singer, songwriter
 Cheech Marin, Mexican-American actor, comedian (Cheech and Chong)
 July 14 
 Vincent Pastore, American actor
 John Wood, Australian actor
 July 15
Hassanal Bolkiah, Sultan of Brunei
 Linda Ronstadt, American singer, songwriter ("You're No Good")
 July 16
 Toshio Furukawa, Japanese voice actor
 Dave Goelz, American puppeteer
 Monica Aspelund, Finnish singer
 Ron Yary, American football player
 July 17 
 Claudia Islas, Mexican actress
 Alun Armstrong, English actor
 July 18 – Kanat Saudabayev, Kazakhstani politician
 July 19 – Ilie Năstase, Romanian tennis player
 July 20 – Htin Kyaw, 9th President of Myanmar
 July 21 – Domingo Cavallo, Argentine economist, politician
 July 22
 Danny Glover, African-American actor, film director and political activist
 Mireille Mathieu, French singer
 Petre Roman, 53rd Prime Minister of Romania
 Johnson Toribiong, 8th President of Palau
 July 23 – Sally Flynn, American singer
 July 25 – Rita Marley, Cuban-Jamaican singer
 July 27
 Gwynne Gilford, American actress
 Jacques Sylla, 12th Prime Minister of Madagascar (d. 2009)
 July 28 – Jonathan Edwards, American singer, songwriter and guitarist
 July 29 – Ximena Armas, Chilean painter
 July 30 
 Neil Bonnett, American race car driver (d. 1994)
 A. Rahman Hassan, Malaysian singer (d. 2019)

August

 August 1
 Mike Emrick, American sportscaster
 Sandi Griffiths, American singer
 August 3 – Jack Straw, English politician
 August 5
 Reinhard Tritscher, Austrian alpine skier (d. 2018)
 Ron Silliman, American poet
 Loni Anderson, American actress (WKRP in Cincinnati)
 Shirley Ann Jackson, African-American President of Rensselaer Polytechnic Institute, Chair of the President's Intelligence Advisory Board
 August 6 – Allan Holdsworth, British musician (d. 2017)
 August 8 – Ralph Gonsalves, 4th Prime Minister of Saint Vincent and the Grenadines
 August 9 – Jim Kiick, American football player
 August 11 – Óscar Berger, 34th President of Guatemala
 August 12 – Terry Nutkins, English naturalist (d. 2012)
 August 13 – Janet Yellen, American Chair of the Federal Reserve
 August 14 – Dennis Hof, American brothel owner (d. 2018)
 August 16 
Masoud Barzani, Iraqi-Kurdish politician, President of Iraqi Kurdistan
Lesley Ann Warren, American actress, singer
 August 17 – Drake Levin, American rock guitarist (Paul Revere & the Raiders) (d. 2009)
 August 19
 Charles Bolden, African-American astronaut
 Bill Clinton, 42nd President of the United States
 Beat Raaflaub, Swiss conductor
 August 20
 Connie Chung, Asian-American reporter
 Ralf Hütter, German techno musician (Kraftwerk)
 N. R. Narayana Murthy, Indian businessman
 August 23
 Keith Moon, English rock drummer (The Who) (d. 1978)
 Raza Murad, Indian actor
 August 24 – John Grahl, British economist
 August 25
 Rollie Fingers, American baseball player
 Charles Ghigna, American poet, children's author
 August 26
 Valerie Simpson, African-American singer
 Mark Snow, American composer
 Zhou Ji, education minister of the People's Republic of China
 Swede Savage, American race car driver (d. 1973)
 August 29
 Jean-Baptiste Bagaza, 2nd President of Burundi (d. 2016)
 Bob Beamon, American athlete
 Demetris Christofias, 6th President of Cyprus (d. 2019)
 Leona Gom, Canadian novelist and poet
 August 30
 Queen Anne-Marie of Greece
 Peggy Lipton, American actress and model (d. 2019)
 August 31
 Ann Coffey, Scottish politician 
 Jerome Corsi, American political commentator and conspiracy theorist
 Tom Coughlin, American football player, coach, and executive

September

 September 1
 Barry Gibb, English-born Australian singer (Bee Gees)
 Roh Moo-hyun, President of South Korea (d. 2009)
 September 2
 Luis Ávalos, Cuban-born American character actor (d. 2014)
 Billy Preston, African-American soul musician ("Nothing from Nothing") (d. 2006)
 Dan White, American politician, murderer (d. 1985)
 September 3
 John N. Abrams, American military officer (d. 2018) 
 Francisco Trois, Brazilian chess player
 September 4
 Gary Duncan, American rock guitarist (Quicksilver Messenger Service) (d. 2019)
 Greg Elmore, American rock drummer (Quicksilver Messenger Service)
 September 5
 Dennis Dugan, American actor, director
 Freddie Mercury, British-Indian singer, songwriter, pianist, frontman of the rock band Queen (d. 1991)
 Loudon Wainwright III, American songwriter, folk singer, humorist, and actor
 September 7
 Willie Crawford, American baseball player (d. 2004)
 Francisco Varela, Chilean biologist (d. 2001)
 September 8
 Aziz Sancar, Turkish biochemist, recipient of the Nobel Prize in Chemistry
 Wong Kan Seng, Singaporean business executive, former Deputy Prime Minister of Singapore
 September 9
 Doug Ingle, American rock vocalist (Iron Butterfly)
 Bruce Palmer, Canadian musician (Buffalo Springfield) (d. 2004)
 September 10
 Michèle Alliot-Marie, French politician
 Jim Hines, American athlete
 Don Powell, English rock drummer (Slade)
 September 12 – Neil Lyndon, British journalist, writer
 September 13 – Henri Kuprashvili, Georgian swimmer
 September 15
 Tommy Lee Jones, American actor (Men in Black)
 Tetsu Nakamura, Japanese-Afghan physician (d. 2019)
 Oliver Stone, American film director, producer (JFK)
 September 16 – Camilo Sesto, Spanish singer-songwriter music producer and composer (d. 2019)
 September 18
 Peter Alsop, American musician
 Akira Kamiya, Japanese voice actor
 September 19 – Connie Kreski, American model (d. 1995)
 September 20 – Dorothy Hukill, American politician (d. 2018)
 September 21
 Mikhail Kovalchuk, Russian physicist, official
 Moritz Leuenberger, Swiss Federal Councilor
 Richard St. Clair, American musician, composer
 Mart Siimann, Prime Minister of Estonia
 September 23 – Franz Fischler, Austrian politician
 September 24
 Lars Emil Johansen, Prime Minister of Greenland
 María Teresa Ruiz, Chilean astronomer
 September 25
 Morari Bapu, Hindu Kathakaar
 Felicity Kendal, English actress
 Jerry Penrod, American bass player
 September 26
 Andrea Dworkin, American feminist, writer (d. 2005)
 Togo Igawa, Japanese actor
 Radha Krishna Mainali, Nepalese politician
 Christine Todd Whitman, American politician
 September 28 – Jeffrey Jones, American actor
 September 29 
 Shafie Salleh, Malaysian politician (d. 2019)
 Celso Pitta, Brazilian economist and politician (d. 2009)
 September 30
 Héctor Lavoe, Puerto Rican singer (d. 1993)
 Claude Vorilhon, French-born 'messenger' of Raëlism
 Fran Brill, Muppeteer
 Lee Yock Suan, Former Minister for Education of Singapore

October

 October 2
 General Sonthi Boonyaratglin, President of the Council for National Security, Commander-in-Chief of the Royal Thai Army
 Marie-Georges Pascal, French actress
 October 3 – P. P. Arnold, American singer
 October 4 
 Susan Sarandon, American actress
 Rhie Won-bok, South Korean artist
 Chuck Hagel, American politician, 24 United States Secretary of Defense
 October 6
 Lloyd Doggett, American politician
 Vinod Khanna, Indian actor, producer and politician (d. 2017)
 October 7
 Nader Al-Dahabi, Prime Minister of Jordan
 Catharine MacKinnon, American feminist
 Xue Jinghua, Chinese ballerina
 October 8
 Hanan Ashrawi, Palestinian scholar, legislator
 John T. Walton, American son of Wal-Mart founder Sam Walton (d. 2005)
 October 10
 Anne Boyd, Australian musician
 Mildred Grieveson, British writer
 Naoto Kan, 61st Prime Minister of Japan
 Charles Dance, English actor, screenwriter and film director
 Chris Tarrant, British radio, TV personality
 October 11
 Daryl Hall, American rock musician (Hall & Oates)
 Sawao Katō, Japanese gymnast
 October 12 – Drew Edmondson, American politician
 October 13
 Edwina Currie, English politician
 Dorothy Moore, American singer
 Demond Wilson, African-American actor, minister (Sanford and Son)
 October 14
 Craig Venter, American biotechnologist 
Dan McCafferty, Scottish rock singer (d. 2022)
 François Bozizé, President of the Central African Republic
 Joey de Leon, Filipino actor, host
 Justin Hayward, English rock singer, songwriter (The Moody Blues)
 October 15
 Richard Carpenter, American pop musician, composer (The Carpenters)
 John Getz, American actor
 October 16
 Suzanne Somers, American actress, singer (Three's Company)
 Elizabeth Witmer, Dutch-born politician
 October 17
 Vicki Hodge, English actress, model
 Bob Seagren, American athlete, actor
 October 18
 James Robert Baker, American novelist, screenwriter
 Howard Shore, Canadian film composer
 Andrea Zsadon, Hungarian soprano
 October 19 – Philip Pullman, English author
 October 20
 Marty Gervais, Canadian writer
 Elfriede Jelinek, Austrian writer, Nobel Prize laureate
 October 21 
Lyn Allison, Australian politician
Lux Interior, American rock musician (The Cramps) (d. 2009)
 October 22 
 Eileen Gordon, British politician
 Richard McGonagle, American actor
 October 25 – Edith Leyrer, Austrian actress
 October 26 – Pat Sajak, American game-show host (Wheel of Fortune)
 October 27
 Leslie L. Byrne, American politician
 Steven R. Nagel, American astronaut (d. 2014)
 Ivan Reitman, Slovakian-born film director, producer (d. 2022)
 October 28
 John Hewson, Australian politician
 Sharon Thesen, Canadian poet
 October 29 
 Peter Green, British musician (d. 2020)
 Kathryn J. Whitmire, Texas politician; Mayor of Houston, Texas
 October 30
 Lynne Marta, American actress
 Andrea Mitchell, American journalist
 October 31 – Stephen Rea, Northern Irish actor

November

 November 1
 Ric Grech, British rock bassist (d. 1990)
 Lynne Russell, American newsreader
 November 2 
 Giuseppe Sinopoli, Italian conductor, composer (d. 2001)
 Marieta Severo, Brazilian actress
 November 4 
 Laura Bush, former First Lady of the United States
 Les Lannom, American actor, musician
 Robert Mapplethorpe, American photographer (d. 1989)
 November 5
 Herman Brood, Dutch artist (d. 2001)
 Loleatta Holloway, American singer (d. 2011)
 Gram Parsons, American musician (d. 1973)
 November 6 – Sally Field, American actress, singer (The Flying Nun)
 November 7 – Diane Francis, Canadian journalist
 November 8
 Stefan Weber, Austrian singer (d. 2018)
 Stella Chiweshe, Zimbabwean musician
 John Farrar, Australian guitarist, singer and songwriter (The Shadows; Marvin, Welch & Farrar)
 Guus Hiddink, Dutch football player, manager
 November 10 – Alaina Reed Hall, American actress (d. 2009)
 November 12 – P. P. Arnold, English singer
 November 13 – Ohara Reiko, Japanese actress
 November 15
 Gwyneth Powell, British actress
 Sandy Skoglund, American photographer
 November 16
 Mahasti, Iranian singer (d. 2007)
 Terence McKenna, American writer, philosopher, ethnobotanist and shaman (d. 2000)
 Jo Jo White, American basketball player (d. 2018)
 November 17 – Petra Burka, Canadian figure skater
 November 18
 Andrea Allan, Scottish actress
 Alan Dean Foster, American novelist
 November 20
Duane Allman, American rock guitarist, co-founder and leader of the Allman Brothers Band (d. 1971)
 Samuel E. Wright, American actor and singer (d. 2021)
 November 21
 Emma Cohen, Spanish actress
 Chaviva Hošek, Czech-born feminist
 Jacky Lafon, Belgian actress
 Marina Warner, English writer
 November 22
 Anne Wheeler, Canadian television, film director
 Aston Barrett, Jamaican reggae musician
 November 23
 Diana Quick, English actress
 Bobby Rush, African-American politician, activist and pastor
 November 24 – Ted Bundy, American serial killer (d. 1989)
 November 25
 Atiku Abubakar, 11th Vice President of Nigeria
 Marika Lindström, Swedish actress
 November 26 – Ottilia Borbáth, Romanian-born Hungarian actress
 November 27
 Richard Codey, American politician, 53rd Governor of New Jersey
 Ismaïl Omar Guelleh, 2nd President of Djibouti
 Nina Maslova, Russian actress
 November 28 – Regina Braga, Brazilian actress
 November 29
 Brian Cadd, Australian singer, songwriter
 Suzy Chaffee, American singer, actress
 November 30
 Marina Abramović, Yugoslavian performance artist
 Barbara Cubin, U.S. Congresswoman from Wyoming

December

 December 1 – Jonathan Katz, American comedian, actor and voice actor
 December 2 – Gianni Versace, Italian fashion designer (d. 1997)
 December 3
 Marjana Lipovšek, Slovenian singer, actress
 Joop Zoetemelk, Dutch cyclist
 December 4
 Sherry Alberoni, American actress, voice artist
 Yō Inoue, Japanese voice actress (d. 2003)
 Karina, Spanish singer/actress
 December 5
 José Carreras, Spanish tenor
 Eva-Britt Svensson, Swedish politician
 December 6
 Roger Hoy, English footballer (d. 2018)
 Nancy Brinker, American health activist, diplomat
 December 8
 Jacques Bourboulon, French photographer
 John Rubinstein, American actor
 Sharmila Tagore, Indian actress
 December 9 – Sonia Gandhi, Indian politician
 December 10
 Chrystos, American poet
 Thomas Lux, American poet
 December 11
 Rhoma Irama, Indonesian dangdut musician, actor and politician
 Susan Kyle, American writer
 Ellen Meloy, American writer (d. 2004)
 December 12
 Emerson Fittipaldi, Brazilian racing car driver
 Gloria Loring, American singer
 Don Gummer, American sculptor
 December 13
 Nicholas Kollerstrom, British writer
 Heather North, American television, voice actress (d. 2017)
 December 14
 Antony Beevor, English historian
 Jane Birkin, English actress, singer
 Patty Duke, American actress (d. 2016)
 Lynne Marie Stewart, American actress 
 Michael Ovitz, American talent agent, co-founded Creative Artists Agency
 December 16
Benny Andersson, Swedish rock singer, songwriter (ABBA)
 Alice Aycock, American sculptor
 Trevor Pinnock, English harpsichordist, conductor
 December 17
 Eugene Levy, Canadian actor, comedian and director (Second City Television)
 Bel Mooney, English broadcast journalist
 Jayne Eastwood, Canadian actress, voice actress
 Suresh Oberoi, Indian actor
 December 18
 Steve Biko, South African anti-apartheid activist (d. 1977)
 Nina Škottová, Czech politician, member of the European Parliament
 Steven Spielberg, American film director (Jaws)
 December 19
 Candace Pert, American neuroscientist
 Robert Urich, American actor (d. 2002)
 December 20
 Uri Geller, Israeli illusionist
 Lesley Judd, English television presenter
 Sonny Perdue, American politician, 81st Governor of Georgia, 31st U.S. Secretary of Agriculture
 John Spencer, American actor (d. 2005)
 Dick Wolf, American television producer
 December 21
Brian Davison, Rhodesian cricketer, Tasmanian politician
 Carl Wilson, American musician (The Beach Boys) (d. 1998)
 December 23
 Edita Gruberová, Slovakian soprano (d. 2021)
 Susan Lucci, American actress (General Hospital)
 John Sullivan, English television scriptwriter (d. 2011)
 December 24
Jan Akkerman, Dutch rock guitarist (Focus)
 Roselyne Bachelot-Narquin, French politician, member of the European Parliament
 Brenda Howard, American bisexual activist (d. 2005)
 Jeff Sessions, American politician, United States Attorney General
 December 25 – Jimmy Buffett, American rock singer, songwriter ("Margaritaville")
 December 27 – Janet Street-Porter, English broadcast journalist
 December 28
 Mike Beebe, American politician and attorney
 Edgar Winter, American rock musician ("Frankenstein")
 December 29
 Marianne Faithfull, English singer, actress
 Ruth Shady, Peruvian archaeologist
 December 30
 Patti Smith, American poet, singer
 Berti Vogts, German football player and manager
 December 31 
 Diane von Fürstenberg, Belgian-American fashion designer
 Lyudmila Pakhomova, Soviet Ice dancer (d.1986)

Date unknown
 Ali Abu Al-Ragheb, Prime Minister of Jordan
 Jang Song-thaek, North Korean politician (d. 2013)
 Miklós Lukáts, Hungarian politician (d. 2022)
 Afsaneh Najmabadi, Iranian historian, gender theorist
 Raul Bragança Neto, 8th Prime Minister of São Tomé and Príncipe (d. 2014)

Deaths

January

 January 2 – Fabijan Abrantovich, Soviet civic, religious leader (b. 1884)
 January 3 – William Joyce, Irish-born American World War II Nazi propaganda broadcaster known as "Lord Haw-Haw" (executed) (b. 1906)
 January 4 – George Woolf, Canadian jockey (b. 1910)
 January 5 – Kitty Cheatham, American singer (b. 1864)
 January 6
 Georg, Prince of Saxe-Meiningen (b. 1892)
 Slim Summerville, American actor (b. 1892)
 January 8 – Dion Fortune, British writer (b. 1890)
 January 9
 Countee Cullen, American poet (b. 1903)
 Sir Nevil Macready, British army general, police commissioner (b. 1862)
 January 10
 László Bárdossy, Hungarian diplomat, politician and 33rd Prime Minister of Hungary (b. 1890)
 Harry Von Tilzer, American songwriter (b. 1872)
 January 13 – Wilhelm Souchon, German admiral (b. 1864)
 January 15 – Karl Nabersberg, German youth leader (b. 1908)
 January 23 – Matteo Bartoli, Italian linguist (b. 1873)
 January 25 – Orishatukeh Faduma, American missionary (b. 1855)
 January 29 
 Hideo Hatoyama, Japanese jurist (b. 1884)
 Harry Hopkins, American politician (b. 1890)
 Adriaan van Maanen, Dutch–born American astronomer (b. 1884)
 January 31 
 Pietro Boetto, Italian Roman Catholic cardinal and eminence (b. 1871)
 Luis Orgaz Yoldi, Spanish general (b. 1881)

February

 February 2 – Rondo Hatton, American actor (b. 1894)
 February 5 – George Arliss, British actor (b. 1868)
 February 6 
 Upendranath Brahmachari, Indian scientist (b. 1873)
 Oswald Kabasta, Austrian conductor (suicide) (b. 1896)
 February 8
 Felix Hoffmann, German chemist (b. 1868)
 Miles Mander, British actor (b. 1888)
 February 11 – Ludovic-Oscar Frossard, French socialist, communist politician (b. 1889)
 February 12 – George Dumas, French doctor, psychologist (b. 1866)
 February 15 
 Maliq Bushati, Albanian collaborator, 18th Prime Minister of Albania (b. 1880)
 Cornelius Johnson, American field athlete (b. 1913)
 February 17 
 Dorothy Gibson, American actress (b. 1889)
 Benjamin I, Ecumenical Patriarch of Constantinople (b. 1871)
 February 19 – Rafael Erich, Finnish politician, professor, diplomat and 6th Prime Minister of Finland (b. 1879)
 February 21 – Theodore Stark Wilkinson, American admiral (b. 1888)
 February 23 – Tomoyuki Yamashita, Japanese general (executed) (b. 1885)
 February 25 – René Le Grèves, French cyclist (b. 1910)
 February 26 – Jackie, Nubian-born MGM lion (b. 1915)
 February 27 – James Cecil Parke, Irish rugby player, tennis player and golfer (b. 1910)
 February 28
 Béla Imrédy, Hungarian economist, politician and 32nd Prime Minister of Hungary (b. 1891)
 Giuseppe Salvago Raggi, Italian diplomat (b. 1866)

March

 March 3 – Viktor Axmann, Yugoslav architect (b. 1883)
 March 4
 Bror von Blixen-Finecke, Swedish big-game hunter (b. 1886)
 Martyrs of Albania, Catholics (executed)
 Mark Çuni, seminarian (b. 1919)
 Daniel Dajani, Jesuit priest (b. 1906)
 Giovanni Fausti, Italian Jesuit priest (b. 1899)
 Gjelosh Lulashi (b. 1925)
 Qerim Sadiku (b. 1919)
 Kolë Shllaku, friar (b. 1906)
 March 6 – Antonio Caso Andrade, Mexican philosopher (b. 1878)
 March 9 – Adolfo Ferrata, Italian pathologist, hematologist (b. 1880)
 March 12
 Ferenc Szálasi, Hungarian military officer, Fascist politician and 37th Prime Minister of Hungary (executed) (b. 1897)
 Leonida Tonelli, Italian mathematician (b. 1885)
 March 13 – Werner von Blomberg, German field marshal (b. 1878)
 March 16 
 José Júlio da Costa, Portuguese activist (b. 1893)
 Alladiya Khan, Indian singer (b. 1855)
 March 17 – Joseph de Pesquidoux, French writer (b. 1869)
 March 19 – Augusto Nicolás Martínez, Ecuadorian agronomist, economist, geologist, researcher, educator and mountaineer (b. 1860)
 March 20 – Frederick M. Smith, American religious leader and author (b. 1874)
 March 22 – Clemens August Graf von Galen, German Catholic Cardinal, Bishop of Münster (b. 1878)
 March 23
 Francisco Largo Caballero, Spanish politician, trade unionist and 66th Prime Minister of Spain (b. 1869)
 Gilbert N. Lewis, American chemist (b. 1875)
 March 24
 Alexander Alekhine, Russian chess player (b. 1892)
 Carl Schuhmann, German athlete (b. 1869)
 Barbu Știrbey, 30th Prime Minister of Romania (b. 1872)
 March 26 – Ezequiel Fernández, acting President of Panama (b. 1886)
 March 29 – László Endre, Hungarian politician (b. 1895)
 March 31 – John Vereker, 6th Viscount Gort, British field marshal (b. 1886)

April

 April 1
 Noah Beery, American actor (b. 1882)
 Edward Sheldon, American playwright (b. 1886)
 April 2 – Kate Bruce, American silent screen actress (b. 1858)
 April 3
 Alf Common, English footballer (b. 1880)
 Masaharu Homma, Japanese general (executed) (b. 1887)
 April 5
 Ion Boițeanu, Romanian general (b. 1885)
Vincent Youmans, American composer (b. 1898)
 April 6
 Chief Thunderbird, Native American actor (b. 1866)
 James Young Deer, Native American film producer (b. 1876)
 April 7 – Padmanath Gohain Baruah, Indian novelist, poet and dramatist (b. 1871)
 April 8
 Bo Gu, 3rd General Secretary of the Chinese Communist Party (accident) (b. 1907)
 Patriarch Eulogius (b. 1868)
 April 13 –  William Henry Bell, English-born South African composer, conductor and lecturer.
 April 14 – Otto Dowling, United States Navy Captain, 25th Governor of American Samoa (b. 1881)
 April 15 
 Infanta Adelgundes, Duchess of Guimarães (b. 1858)
 C. W. A. Scott, English aviator (b. 1903)
 April 17 
 Guido Calza, Italian archaeologist (b. 1888)
 Juan Bautista Sacasa, 20th President of Nicaragua (b. 1874)
 April 20 – Mae Busch, American actress (b. 1891)
 April 21 – John Maynard Keynes, British economist (b. 1883)
 April 22
 Lionel Atwill, British actor (b. 1885)
 Harlan F. Stone, Chief Justice of the United States (b. 1872)
 April 28 – Robert Bartlett, American explorer, and navigator (b. 1875)
 April 30 – Sava Athanasiu, Romanian geologist, paleontologist (b. 1861)

May

 May 1
 Bill Johnston, American tennis champion (b. 1894)
 Israfil Mammadov, Soviet WWII heroine (b. 1919)
 May 9 – Léon Guillet, French metallurgist (b. 1873)
 May 10 – Emile de Cartier de Marchienne, Belgian diplomat (b. 1871)
 May 11 – Pedro Henríquez Ureña, Dominican essayist, philosopher, humanist and philologist (b. 1884)
 May 13 – Alexei Nikolaevich Bach, Soviet biochemist, revolutionary leader (b. 1857)
 May 16
 Bruno Tesch, German chemist, Nazi war criminal (executed) (b. 1890)
 Karl Weinbacher, German manager, war criminal (executed) (b. 1898)
 May 19 
 Francesco Camero Medici, Italian diplomat (b. 1886)
 Ángel Ossorio y Gallardo, Spanish lawyer, statesman (b. 1873)
 Booth Tarkington, American novelist (b. 1869)
 May 20
 Jacob Ellehammer, Danish inventor (b. 1871)
 Enrico Gasparri, Italian Roman Catholic cardinal, archbishop (b. 1871)
 May 22 – Karl Hermann Frank, German Nazi official, war criminal (executed) (b. 1898)
 May 23 – Billy Sullivan, American actor (b. 1891)
 May 26 
 Friedrich, Prince of Waldeck and Pyrmont (b. 1865)
 Joseffy, Austrian magician (b. 1873)
 May 27 
 Claire Croiza, French soprano (b. 1882)
 Henri Hauser, French historian, geographer and economist (b. 1866)
 May 28 – Claus Schilling, German medical researcher and war criminal (executed) (b. 1871)
 May 29 – Cagnaccio di San Pietro, Italian painter (b. 1897)
 May 30
Marcela Agoncillo, Filipino who sewed the first Filipino flag (b. 1860)
Louis Slotin, Canadian physicist, chemist (b. 1910)
 May 31 – Picoğlu Osman, Turkish kemenche player (b. 1901)

June

 June 1
 Ion Antonescu, Romanian soldier, politician, 43rd Prime Minister of Romania and Romanian dictator (executed) (b. 1882)
 Leo Slezak, German tenor (b. 1873)
 June 3 – Mikhail Kalinin, 1st Head of State/President of the Soviet Union  (b. 1875)
 June 4 – Sándor Simonyi-Semadam, Hungarian politician, 26th Prime Minister of Hungary (b. 1864)
 June 5 – Maud Watson, British tennis player, first female Wimbledon champion (b. 1864)
 June 6
 Isidro Ancheta, Filipino painter (d. 1882)
 Gerhart Hauptmann, German writer, Nobel Prize laureate (b. 1862)
 June 9 – Ananda Mahidol (Rama VIII), King of Thailand (assassinated) (b. 1925)
 June 10 – Jack Johnson, American boxer (b. 1878)
 June 11 – Juanita Breckenridge Bates, American minister (b. 1860)
 June 12 – Hisaichi Terauchi, Marshal of the Imperial Japanese Army (b. 1879)
 June 13 – Charles Butterworth, American actor (b. 1896)
 June 14
 Jorge Ubico, Guatemalan army general, 21st President of Guatemala (b. 1878)
 John Logie Baird, British television pioneer (b. 1888)
 Edward Bowes, American radio personality (b. 1874)
 June 15 
 João Batista Becker, German-born Brazilian Roman Catholic prelate, archbishop (b. 1870)
 Jovita Idar, Mexican-American journalist and political activist (b. 1885)
 June 18 – Eugen Hirschfield, Australian practitioner (b. 1866)
 June 19 – Theodor Wulf, German physicist, Jesuit priest (b. 1868)
 June 20 – Empress Wanrong of China (b. 1906)
 June 23 – William S. Hart, American stage actor, silent film Western star, film director and writer (b. 1864)
 June 24 – Marian Bernaciak, Polish World War II heroine (b. 1917)
 June 27 
 Juan Antonio Ríos, Chilean political figure, 24th President of Chile and World War II leader (b. 1888)
 Wanda Gág, American artist, author, translator and illustrator (b. 1893)
 June 28 – Antoinette Perry, American actress, director (b. 1888)
 June 30 – Jelica Belović-Bernardzikowska, Yugoslav journalist, writer and journalist (b. 1870)

July

 July 1 – Augustyn Józef Czartoryski, Polish nobleman (b. 1907)
 July 2 
 Mary Alden, American stage, and screen actress (b. 1883)
 Albert Sechehaye, Swiss linguist (b. 1870)
 July 3 – Edoardo Bianchi, Italian entrepreneur, inventor (b. 1865)
 July 4
 Jenny-Wanda Barkmann, German Nazi overseer at Stutthof concentration camp (executed) (b. 1922)
 Elisabeth Becker, German Nazi overseer at Stutthof concentration camp (executed) (b. 1923)
 Wanda Klaff, German Nazi overseer at Stutthof concentration camp (executed) (b. 1922)
 Ewa Paradies, German Nazi overseer at Stutthof concentration camp (executed) (b. 1920)
 Gerda Steinhoff, German Nazi overseer at Stutthof concentration camp (executed) (b. 1922)
 July 7 – Federico Laredo Brú, 8th President of Cuba (b. 1875)
 July 8 – Orrick Glenday Johns, American writer (b. 1887)
 July 12
 Ray Stannard Baker, American journalist, author (b. 1870)
 Teresa Janina Kierocińska, Polish Discalced Carmelite nun and venerable (b. 1885)
 July 13 – Alfred Stieglitz, American photographer (b. 1864)
 July 15 – Benjamin W. Alpiner, American businessman and politician (b. 1867)
 July 16 – Raffaele Conflenti, Italian engineer, aircraft designer (b. 1889)
 July 17
 Consolata Betrone, Italian Franciscan mystic and servant of God (b. 1903)
 Florence Fuller, South African-born Australian artist (b. 1867)
 Kosta Mušicki, Yugoslav general (b. 1897)
 Sir Campbell Tait, admiral and Governor of Southern Rhodesia (b. 1886)
 July 18
 Ehrhard Schmidt, German admiral (b. 1863)
 Alfons Tracki, Albanian priest (executed) (b. 1896)
 July 19 – George Mackenzie Brown, Canadian-born British publisher (b. 1869)
 July 20 – Shiro Kawase, Japanese admiral (b. 1889)
 July 21 
Shefqet Vërlaci, Albanian politician, 12th Prime Minister of Albania (b. 1877)
 Gualberto Villarroel, 39th President of Bolivia (lynched) (b. 1908)
Arthur Greiser, German general (b. 1897)
 July 22 – Edward Sperling, Russian-American-Jewish writer, Zionist (assassinated) (b. 1889)
 July 26 – Alexander Vvedensky, Soviet Orthodox religious leader and blessed (b. 1889)
 July 25 – Harry Davis, Canadian gangster (b. 1898)
 July 27
 Franz Anton Basch, German politician (b. 1901)
 Gertrude Stein, American writer (b. 1874)
 July 28 – Saint Anna Muttathupadathu, Indian Syro-Malabar Catholic and Eastern Catholic religious sister and saint (b. 1910)
 July 31 – Solomon Dias Bandaranaike, Ceylonese politician, Governor-General of Ceylon (b. 1862)

August

 August 1 – Andrey Vlasov, Soviet general, commander of the Russian Liberation Army (executed) (b. 1901)
 August 2 – Karl, Prince of Leiningen, German prince (b. 1898)
 August 5
 Otto Franke, German sinologist (b. 1863)
 Wilhelm Marx, German lawyer, politician and 17th Chancellor of Germany (b. 1863)
 August 6 
 Blanche Bingley, English tennis champion (b. 1863)
 Tony Lazzeri, American baseball player (New York Yankees), MLB Hall of Famer (b. 1903)
 August 8 – Maria Barrientos, Spanish opera singer (b. 1884)
 August 10 – Léon Gaumont, French film pioneer (b. 1864)
 August 11 – Giuseppe Pietri, Italian composer (b. 1886)
 August 12
 Inayatullah Khan, King of Afghanistan (b. 1888)
 Alfred Stock, German chemist (b. 1876)
 August 13 
 H. G. Wells, British science fiction writer, historian (The Time Machine) (b. 1866)
 Émile Berlia, French politician (b. 1878)
 August 16 – Prince Fushimi Hiroyasu (b. 1875)
 August 17 – Channing Pollock, American playwright (b. 1880)
 August 19 – Jules-Albert de Dion, French automobile pioneer (b. 1856)
 August 20 – "Rags" Ragland, American comedian, actor (b. 1905)
 August 22 – Döme Sztójay, 35th Prime Minister of Hungary (b. 1883)
 August 23 – Prince Fulco Ruffo di Calabria (b. 1884)
 August 24 – James Clark McReynolds, American jurist (b. 1862)
 August 26 – Jeanie MacPherson, American actress (b. 1887)
 August 28
 Georgios Kafantaris, Prime Minister of Greece (b. 1873)
 Rudolph Lambart, 10th Earl of Cavan, British field marshal (b. 1865)
 Florence Turner, American actress (b. 1885)
 August 29 – John Steuart Curry, American painter (b. 1897)

September

 September 3 – Paul Lincke, German composer (b. 1866)
September 4 - Nobu Shirase, Japanese army officer and Antarctic explorer (b. 1861)
 September 11 – Francesco Bonifacio, Italian Roman Catholic priest and blessed (killed in action) (b. 1912)
 September 13 – William Watt, Australian politician, Premier of Victoria (b. 1871)
 September 16
 Henri Gouraud, French general (b. 1867)
 James Hopwood Jeans, English physicist, astronomer and mathematician (b. 1877)
 September 24 – Gustav Globočnik Edler von Vojka, Austro-Hungarian nobleman and field marshal (b. 1859)
 September 25 – Heinrich George, German actor (b. 1893)
 September 29 – Raimu, French actor (b. 1883)
 September 30 – Takashi Sakai, Japanese general (executed) (b. 1887)

October

 October 1
 Hiroshi Kawabuchi, Japanese politician (b. 1883)
 Lucy Wheelock, American early childhood education pioneer (b. 1857)
 October 2 – Ignacy Mościcki, Polish chemist, politician and 4th President of Poland (b. 1867)
 October 4 – Barney Oldfield, American race car driver, automobile pioneer (b. 1878)
 October 5
 István Bethlen, Hungarian aristocrat, statesman and 28th Prime Minister of Hungary (b. 1874)
 Alberto Marvelli, Italian member of the Roman Catholic action and blessed (b. 1918)
 October 6
 Per Albin Hansson, Swedish politician, 23rd Prime Minister of Sweden (b. 1885)
 Joseph Francis Sartori, American banker (b. 1858)
 October 8 – Agustín Parrado y García, Spanish Roman Catholic cardinal (b. 1872)
 October 12 – Joseph Stilwell, American World War II general (b. 1883)
 October 15 – Hermann Göring, German Nazi Reichsmarschall (suicide) (b. 1893)
 October 16 
 Nuremberg executions
 Hans Frank, German Nazi Governor General of Poland (b. 1900)
 Wilhelm Frick, German Nazi Minister of the Interior (b. 1877)
 Alfred Jodl, German general, World War II Chief of the German armed forces (b. 1890)
 Ernst Kaltenbrunner, German Nazi police general (b. 1903)
 Wilhelm Keitel, German field marshal (b. 1882)
 Joachim von Ribbentrop, German Nazi foreign minister (b. 1893)
 Alfred Rosenberg, German Nazi ideologist (b. 1893)
 Fritz Sauckel, German Nazi general plenipotentiary (b. 1892)
 Arthur Seyss-Inquart, Austrian Nazi leader (b. 1892)
 Julius Streicher, German Nazi propaganda publisher (b. 1885)
 October 20 – Igor Demidov, Soviet politician (b. 1873)
 October 23 – Francesco Carandini, Italian poet (b. 1858)
 October 24 – Kurt Daluege, German Nazi officer, SS general and police official, war criminal (executed) (b. 1897)
 October 27 - Nathan Francis Mossell, African-American physician (b. 1856)

November

 November 2 – John Barrett, British clergyman, Roman Catholic bishop and reverend (b. 1878)
 November 4 – Rüdiger von der Goltz, German general (b. 1865)
 November 5 – Joseph Stella, Italian-American painter (b. 1877)
 November 6 – Maria Innocentia Hummel, German Franciscan religious sister and blessed (b. 1909)
 November 7 – Henry Lehrman, American actor (b. 1886)
 November 10 – Baldassare Forestiere, Italian immigrant to America (b. 1879)
 November 11 – Nikolay Burdenko, Soviet surgeon, founder of Soviet neurosurgery (b. 1876)
 November 12 – Camillo Caccia Dominioni, Italian Roman Catholic cardinal, eminence (b. 1877)
 November 14 – Manuel de Falla, Spanish composer (b. 1876)
 November 18 – Donald Meek, British actor (b. 1878)
 November 24 – László Moholy-Nagy, Hungarian painter, photographer (b. 1895)
 November 25 – George Gandy, American entrepreneur (b. 1851)
 November 26 – Sultana Racho Petrova, Bulgarian memoirist (b. 1869)
 November 28 – Maria Izabela Wiłucka-Kowalska, Polish Roman Catholic religious leader, saint (b. 1890)

December

 December 5 – Louis Dewis, Belgian Post-Impressionist painter (b. 1872)
 December 6 – Charles Stewart, Canadian politician, Premier of Alberta (b. 1868)
 December 7
 Laurette Taylor, American actress (b. 1884)
 Sada Yacco, Japanese stage actress (b. 1871)
 December 10
 Walter Johnson, American baseball player (Washington Senators), MLB Hall of Famer (b. 1887)
 Damon Runyon, American writer (b. 1880)
 December 12 
 Ben Carter, American actor (b. 1910)
 Renée Falconetti, French actress (b. 1892)
 December 14 – Tom Dowse, Irish major league baseball player in the 1890s (b. 1866)
 December 16 – Salman al-Murshid, Syrian religious leader, political figure (b. 1907)
 December 20 – Einosuke Harada, Japanese ophthalmologist (b. 1892)
 December 22 – Pierre Bénard, French journalist (b. 1898)
 December 23 – John A. Sampson, American gynecologist (b. 1873)
 December 25
 W. C. Fields, American actor, comedian (b. 1880)
 Henri Le Fauconnier, French painter (b. 1881)
 December 26 – Franjo Bučar, Yugoslav writer (b. 1866)
 December 27 – Pedro Mata Dominguez, Spanish novelist, playwright and poet (b. 1875)
 December 28 
 Carrie Jacobs-Bond, American singer, songwriter (b. 1862)
 Francis Salabert, French publisher (b. 1884)
 December 29 – John Babington Macaulay Baxter, Canadian politician, 19th Premier of New Brunswick (b. 1858)

Nobel Prizes

 Physics – Percy Williams Bridgman
 Chemistry – James B. Sumner, John Howard Northrop, Wendell Meredith Stanley
 Physiology or Medicine – Hermann Joseph Muller
 Literature – Hermann Hesse
 Peace – Emily Greene Balch, John Mott

References

Further reading
 Goulden, Joseph C. The Best Years: 1945–1950 (1976), popular social history of USA
 Hennessy, Peter. Never Again: Britain, 1945–1951 (1994)), a scholarly survey.
 Kynaston, David. Austerity Britain, 1945–1951 (2008) excerpt and text search, a detaied social history.
 Sebestyen, Victor. 1946: The Making of the Modern World (2015) excerpt
 Weisbrode, Kenneth. The Year of Indecision, 1946: A Tour Through the Crucible of Harry Truman's America (2016) excerpt

External links
 Newsreel May 23, 1946: Rail strike paralyzes the United States
 Newsreel May 29, 1946: End of U.S. coal strike